Summer Romance is a Cantopop album by singer Leslie Cheung first released in 1987. It was an album that further boosted the pop star's huge popularity and celebrity power. It was awarded Best Selling Album in the Jade Solid Gold 1987 in Hong Kong.

Its popular songs include "Don't Wanna Play Anymore" (拒絕再玩),  "Sleepless Night" (無心睡眠) which won the Jade Solid Gold Award for Best Song in 1987, "Enduring Together" (共同渡過), "Enough" (夠了), and "A Chinese Ghost Story" (倩女幽魂) which is the main theme for the blockbuster film starring Leslie Cheung and Joey Wong.

Track listing
 "Don't Wanna Play Anymore" (拒絕再玩) – 3:35
 "Sleepless Night" (無心睡眠) – 3:08
 "Where Are You?" (你在何地) – 4:57
 "Invisible Lock"  (無形鎖扣) – 4:18
 "Ecstasy"  (妄想) – 4:02
 "Enduring Together" (共同渡過) – 4:23
 "Difficult Sentimentality" (情難自控) – 4:13
 "Enough" (夠了) – 3:53
 "Please Don't Misunderstand" (請勿越軌) – 3:30
 "A Chinese Ghost Story" (倩女幽魂) – 3:32

Personnel
Performers
Leslie Cheung: Solo and background vocals
Johnny Boy, Ricky Chu: Drums
Eddie Sing, Tony Kiang: Bass
Anthony Sun, Hidetoshi Yamada: Keyboard
Fujimori Yoshino, Tommy Ho: Guitar
Ric Halstead, Jake Concepcion: saxophone

Production
Producer: Leslie Cheung, Patrick Yeung, Gary Tong
Recording/Mixing: Owen Kwan, Bryan Choi
Cover Design and Art: Alan Chan
Photography: Nobuharu Kondo
Music arranger: Ken Takada
Synthesizer Operator: Keiji Toriyama
Engineer: Shigeki Fujino
Co-ordinator: Tony Tang

References

Leslie Cheung albums
1987 albums
Cinepoly Records albums